"Kiss the Rain" is a song by British singer Billie Myers, from her debut album, Growing, Pains. It was released on 23 September 1997 as the lead single from the album by Universal Records. The song, produced by Desmond Child, is considered Myers' signature song and is her only notable hit. Myers also recorded a Spanish version of this song titled "Besa la lluvia (Piensa en mí)".

The song charted at number four on the UK Singles Chart for two weeks. It also became an international hit, reaching number two in Canada and number 15 in Sweden and on the US Billboard Hot 100. It was included in season two, episode two of the TV series Dawson's Creek, "Crossroads".

Background
Desmond Child, who produced the album, got the idea for the title after hearing the Bush song "Glycerine". Child misheard the title as "Kiss the Rain." When he was told otherwise, he decided to use "Kiss the Rain" for a future song.

Critical reception
Larry Flick from Billboard wrote that "the gripping, acoustic sounds of the track's mood-setting guitar makes the palpable echoes of Billie Myers' voice really stand out." He noted further that "in fact, the chaotic, ever-sure echo full of Myers' emotions charmingly reaches the audience and has a lasting effect. The drum beats wonderfully complement the compelling guitar sounds. This wonderful single (...) is full of depth, emotion, and musical clarity". Gerald Martinez from New Sunday Times stated that "her arresting voice immediately makes the song a bit special." He also described it as "a song of jealousy and insecurity and vulnerability, over a long-distance lover."

Track listings

 UK 7-inch jukebox single
A. "Kiss the Rain" – 4:30
B. "Kiss the Rain" (radio edit) – 4:09

 UK CD single
 "Kiss the Rain" (radio edit) – 4:09
 "Kiss the Rain" (album version) – 4:30
 "Kiss the Rain" (unplugged) – 7:23
 "Sleeping Beauty" – 3:57

 UK cassette single
 "Kiss the Rain" (radio edit) – 4:09
 "Kiss the Rain" (album version) – 4:30

 Italian 12-inch maxi-single
A1. "Kiss the Rain" (dance mix) – 5:28
A2. "Kiss the Rain" (radio mix) – 3:52
A3. "Kiss the Rain" (original version) – 4:30
B1. "Kiss the Rain" (TP2K club remix) – 7:52
B2. "Kiss the Rain" (Urban Discharge Trippy dub) – 7:55

 US 7-inch single
A. "Kiss the Rain"
B. "Tell Me"

 US and Australian CD single
 "Kiss the Rain"
 "The Shark and the Mermaid"

Personnel
Personnel are adapted from the US CD single liner notes.
 Billie Myers – vocals, background vocals, writing
 Eric Bazilian – background vocals, guitar, bass, keyboards, drum programming, writing
 Desmond Child – background vocals, writing
 Randy Cantor – organ
 Kenny Aronoff – drums and percussion

Charts

Weekly charts

Year-end charts

Certifications

Release history

References

External links
 Kiss the Rain by Yiruma  Piano sheet music | pdf

1990s ballads
1997 debut singles
1997 songs
Music videos credited to Alan Smithee
Rock ballads
Songs written by Billie Myers
Songs written by Desmond Child
Songs written by Eric Bazilian
Universal Records singles